People with the family name Wycherley include:
 Don Wycherley, Irish actor
 Florence Wycherley, Irish politician
 Ralph Wycherley, professional hockey player
 Richard Ernest Wycherley, an English Classicist
 Billy Fury (Ronald Wycherley), singer
 William Wycherley, (c. 1640–1716), English dramatist